Three (sometimes stylized Thr3e) is a 2007 Christian horror thriller film adaptation of the novel of the same name by Ted Dekker. Directed by Robby Henson and written by Alan B. McElroy, it stars Marc Blucas, Justine Waddell, Max Ryan, and Bill Moseley. It was shot on location in Łódź and Warsaw, Poland. The film grossed $1.4 million and has a 5% approval rating at Rotten Tomatoes, which called it a "thrill-free thriller" in its critical consensus.

Plot

Jennifer Peters (Justine Waddell) attempts to save her brother Roy, who has been abducted by a serial killer known as the Riddle Killer – or R.K. – due to his use of riddles in the murders he commits. Jennifer has recently written a book about the nature of serial killers, to which R.K. has taken offense. Jennifer follows R.K.'s clues and finds Roy, but fails to save him as the car in which he is trapped explodes.

Kevin Parson (Marc Blucas) is a seminary theology student who has recently completed the third draft of his thesis about the nature of good and evil. One day he receives a phone call from R.K. (Bill Moseley), ordering him to confess some unspecified sin or his car will explode. He also asks Kevin a riddle: "What falls but never breaks? What breaks but never falls?" Puzzled about the sin and the riddle, Kevin quickly escapes from the car before it explodes. He informs the police, among them Jennifer, but leaves out the part about the sin, believing it's something he did some time ago.

He receives a threat against his childhood dog and goes to the house of his Aunt Balinda (Priscilla Barnes), but fails to save his dog from a bomb. Back home again, he meets his friend since childhood, Samantha Sheer (Laura Jordan) and they decide to try to figure out the mystery of the Riddle Killer who continues to target him and seems to be able to monitor Kevin in his own home. Sam solves the first riddle; the answer is night and day. She is working as an insurance detective and takes to her laboratory  the book in which the killer had hidden a mobile phone.

The police manage to get the bomb off Henry's body. Kevin now remembers a boy who had always watched him and Sam during their childhood. In self-defense, Kevin had locked him in a warehouse and left him to die. He thinks that the boy escaped, and is now R.K.

Later, Kevin finds the papers of his thesis scattered around his room. He finds a TV in his refrigerator which shows R.K. with another riddle: what takes you away but doesn't go anywhere? Kevin confesses leaving the boy in the warehouse and apologizes, hoping to satisfy him so he'll leave him alone. But R.K. does not relent. Kevin and Sam, whose father was a police officer, find out that a bus on 3rd Avenue is in danger and manage to get all the passengers off safely before a bomb explodes.

Jennifer visits Kevin's Aunt Balinda and finds that she has been keeping her husband and son Bobby in the dark about the entire world outside their home, and had done the same to Kevin. She also finds a bloody jacket in the warehouse. Meanwhile, Sam talks with Kevin in a hotel. R.K. sends a recorded message to the hotel room which points to an empty building and the number 33369—the warehouse. Before Jennifer gets to the hotel, Kevin and Sam are at the warehouse, where Sam sees a wall full of enigmatic words and is trapped by the killer. When Kevin enters the building, he finds a bomb. He is unable to stop it but can escape with Sam. Jennifer and the police arrive and investigate. Sam leaves and Kevin insists on not cooperating with Jennifer, as the killer insisted on no police involvement or he'd kill more people. Jennifer declares her resignation, saying that as she is no longer officially involved, she no longer counts. However, Kevin ignores her.

Kevin finds another threat about a house on fire at midnight and realizes that Aunt Balinda is in danger. As he rushes to try to save her, he remembers that she abused him when he was a child. Sam finds a note from R.K. and is startled to realize that he has the same handwriting as Kevin. She calls Jennifer, who tells her that there was only one pair of footprints in the warehouse. Sam is now sure that she never actually saw R.K. The women also realize that all the riddles were about opposites, like nightfall and daybreak, and conclude that R.K. might actually be Kevin's "evil half."

Kevin finds Balinda tied up, and the Riddle Killer introduces himself as Slater (Bill Moseley). Sam rushes to Balinda's house and finds that the Riddle Killer, Slater, is real after all when she looks under the door and sees two pairs of shoes. Slater explains that he will have Kevin kill Balinda, then leave him to take the blame, as everyone will believe Kevin is the Riddle Killer. Jennifer arrives to find Kevin pointing a gun at himself. It turns out that both Slater and Sam are figments of Kevin's imagination; traumatized by Aunt Balinda's abuse, Kevin had imagined his friend Samantha and the boy with whom he had fought, and had subconsciously imitated the real Riddle Killer. Jennifer convinces Kevin of this, and his visions of Slater and Sam vanish.

Kevin had said that the real Riddle Killer was right in front of their eyes, and Jennifer discovers while examining his wall of clippings that the hot dog vendor who had supposedly been given a book by the killer to give to her is at the front of the crowd in a photo, holding a camera. When captured, he confesses that he hates copycats and had meant to kill Kevin for copying him.

Kevin is sent to an institution and Jennifer visits him there.

Cast

Critical reception 
Rotten Tomatoes, a review aggregator, reports that 5% of 37 surveyed critics gave the film a positive review; the average rating is 3.3/10.  The sites' consensus reads: "Thr3e is a shoddily made, thrill-free thriller that isn't half as good as the several movies it borrows from (Adaptation, Saw, Se7en)." The film also has a noticeable resemblance to the plot of a film script created by the character Donald Kaufman in the film Adaptation.

Rotten Tomatoes ranked Thr3e #84 on its "The 100 Worst Reviewed Films of All Time: 2000–2009" list.

Box office 
Three opened in just over 450 theaters and drew in US$700,000 its first weekend.  The film had officially left the box office 17 days after it opened and grossed just over a million dollars.

References

External links
 
 
 

2006 films
2006 horror films
2006 crime thriller films
2000s mystery films
2006 psychological thriller films
American horror thriller films
Films based on American novels
Films about evangelicalism
American serial killer films
Films shot in Poland
Films directed by Robby Henson
Films produced by Ralph Winter
2000s English-language films
2000s American films